Javier García-Sintes (born 2 May 1979) is a Spanish former professional tennis player.

García-Sintes reached a career best singles ranking of 329 in the world and qualified for the main draw of the 2001 Campionati Internazionali di Sicilia, an ATP Tour tournament in Palermo. At ATP Challenger level he made three singles quarter-finals. On the ITF Men's Circuit, he won a total of 11 Futures titles, four in singles and seven in doubles.

ITF Futures titles

Singles: (4)

Doubles: (7)

References

External links
 
 

1979 births
Living people
Spanish male tennis players